The Clerk of the Rolls is a judge and Head of the Judiciary in the Isle of Man.

This position was formerly distinct from that of the Deemsters but now the Clerk of the Rolls is held jointly with the office of First Deemster.

The Clerk of the Rolls formerly had a seat in the Legislative Council.

The current Clerk of the Rolls and First Deemster is His Honour Andrew Corlett QC.

Clerks of the Rolls

John Quayle, 1736-1755
John Quayle, 1755-1797
Mark Hildesley Quayle, 1797 - 1804
Thomas Stowell, 1804 - 1821
John McHutchin, 1821-1847
Mark Hildesley Quayle, 1847-1879
Alfred Walter Adams, 1879-1882
Sir Alured Dumbell, 1883-1900
Sir James Gell, 1900-1905
Thomas Kneen, 1905 - 1916
Stewart Stevenson Moore, 1916-1918

In 1918, the Judicature (Amendment) Act 1918 amalgamated the offices of Clerk of the Rolls and First Deemster.  Thus the Clerk of the Rolls is now the First Deemster.

See also
Deemster
Isle of Man High Court
Manx Judiciary
Master of the Rolls

References

Judiciary of the Isle of Man
Chief justices